Berkshire was a parliamentary constituency in England, represented in the House of Commons of the Parliament of England until 1707, then of the Parliament of Great Britain from 1707 to 1800 and of the Parliament of the United Kingdom from 1801 to 1885. The county returned two knights of the shire until 1832 and three between 1832 and 1885.

Boundaries and boundary changes
This county constituency consisted of the historic county of Berkshire, in south-eastern England to the west of modern Greater London. Its northern boundary was the River Thames. See Historic counties of England for a map and other details. The Great Reform Act made some minor changes to the parliamentary boundaries of the county, transferring parts of five parishes to neighbouring counties while annexing parts of four other parishes which had previously been in Wiltshire.

The county, up to 1885, also contained the borough constituencies of Abingdon (1 seat from 1558), New Windsor (2 seats 1302–1868, 1 seat from 1868), Reading (2 seats from 1295) and Wallingford (2 seats 1295–1832, 1 seat from 1832). Although these boroughs elected MPs in their own right, they were not excluded from the county constituency, and owning property within the borough could confer a vote at the county election.

History
As in other county constituencies the franchise between 1430 and 1832 was defined by the Forty Shilling Freeholder Act, which gave the right to vote to every man who possessed freehold property within the county valued at £2 or more per year for the purpose of land tax; it was not necessary for the freeholder to occupy his land, nor even in later years to be resident in the county at all.

At the time of the Great Reform Act in 1832, Berkshire had a population of about 145,000, but only 3,726 votes were cast at the election of 1818, the highest recorded vote in the county before 1832, even though each voter could cast two votes. Although local landowners could never control a county the size of Berkshire in the way they could own a pocket borough, titled magnates still exercised considerable influence over deferential county voters: in the early 19th century Lord Craven and Lord Braybrooke were considered the "patrons" of the Berkshire constituency and could usually persuade the voters to support their favoured candidates.

The place of election for the county was the then county town of Abingdon. In 1880, according to the report in The Times (of London), the ballot boxes were taken to Reading for the count and declaration of the result, instead of these taking place at Abingdon as had happened previously. Before the Reform Act it was normal for voters to expect the candidates for whom they voted to meet their expenses in travelling to the poll and to provide food, liquor and lodgings when they arrived, making the cost of a contested election in some counties prohibitive, but this was less of a factor in a comparatively small county like Berkshire, and contested elections were not uncommon. Nevertheless, potential candidates preferred to canvass support beforehand and usually did not insist on a vote being taken unless they were confident of winning. There were contests in Berkshire at 11 of the 29 general elections between 1701 and 1832, but in the other 18 the candidates were returned unopposed.

Under the Great Reform Act of 1832, the county franchise was extended to occupiers of land worth £50 or more, as well as the forty-shilling freeholders, and Berkshire was given a third MP. Under the new rules, 5,582 electors were registered and entitled to vote at the general election of 1832.

The constituency was abolished in 1885, and the county was divided into three single-member constituencies: the Northern or Abingdon Division; the Southern or Newbury Division; and the Eastern or Wokingham Division. The Abingdon Division absorbed the abolished parliamentary boroughs of Abingdon and Wallingford, whilst the parliamentary boroughs of Reading and New Windsor were retained, each with 1 MP.

Members of Parliament
 Constituency created (1265): See Simon de Montfort, 6th Earl of Leicester and Montfort's Parliament for further details. Knights of the shire are known to have been summoned to most Parliaments from 1290 (the 19th Parliament of Edward I) and to every one from 1320 (the 19th Parliament of Edward II).

Knights of the shire 1265–1660

Some of the members elected during this period have been identified, but this list does not include Parliaments where no member has been identified. The year given is that of the first meeting of the Parliament, with the month added where there was more than one Parliament in the year. If a second year is given this is a date of dissolution. Early Parliaments usually only sat for a few days or weeks, so dissolutions in the same year as the first meeting are not recorded in this list. If a specific date of election is known this is shown in italic brackets. The Roman numerals in brackets, following some names, are used to distinguish different MPs of the same name in 'The House of Commons' 1509-1558 and 1558-1603.

Knights of the shire 1660–1885

Elections
In multi-member elections the bloc voting system was used. Voters could cast a vote for one or two (or three in three-member elections 1832–1868) candidates, as they chose. The leading candidates with the largest number of votes were elected. In 1868 the limited vote was introduced, which restricted an individual elector to using one or two votes, in elections to fill three seats.

In by-elections, to fill a single seat, the first past the post system applied.

After 1832, when registration of voters was introduced, a turnout figure is given for contested elections. In three-member elections, when the exact number of participating voters is unknown, this is calculated by dividing the number of votes by three (to 1868) and two thereafter. To the extent that electors did not use all their votes this will be an underestimate of turnout.

Where a party had more than one candidate in one or both of a pair of successive elections change is calculated for each individual candidate, otherwise change is based on the party vote.

Candidates for whom no party has been identified are classified as Non Partisan. The candidate might have been associated with a party or faction in Parliament or consider himself to belong to a particular political tradition. Political parties before the 19th century were not as cohesive or organised as they later became. Contemporary commentators (even the reputed leaders of parties or factions) in the 18th century did not necessarily agree who the party supporters were. The traditional parties, which had arisen in the late 17th century, became increasingly irrelevant to politics in the 18th century (particularly after 1760), although for some contests in some constituencies party labels were still used. It was only towards the end of the century that party labels began to acquire some meaning again, although this process was by no means complete for several more generations.

Sources: The results are based on the History of Parliament Trust's volumes on the House of Commons in various periods for 1660–1820, Stooks Smith from 1820 until 1832 and Craig from 1832. Where Stooks Smith gives additional information this is indicated in a note. See references below for further details of these sources.

Elections in the 1660s

 Note (1660): Vote totals not available

Elections in the 1670s
 Succession of Lovelace as 3rd Baron Lovelace 25 November 1670

 Death of Neville 7 October 1676

 Death of Powle 12 July 1678

 Note (1678): The vote totals are unknown but must have been close as the Returning Officer made a double return, which had not been resolved by the House of Commons when Parliament was dissolved on 24 January 1679

Elections in the 1680s

 Note (1685): Vote totals not available

Elections in the 1690s

Elections in the 1700s

Elections in the 1710s

 Creation of St John as the 1st Viscount Bolingbroke

Elections in the 1720s

 Note (1722): Vote totals not available. Sedgwick states that the majority was over 400 and that 2,177 electors voted.
 Note (1727–1768): Namier and Brook observe that there were no contested elections and that the county was represented by a succession of Tory country gentlemen. Sedgwick however identified a contested election in 1727.

Elections in the 1730s
 Death of Packer 4 April 1731

 Death of Stonhouse 10 October 1733

 Death of Archer 30 June 1739

Elections in the 1740s

 Death of Packer 21 August 1746

Elections in the 1750s

 Death of Powney 8 March 1757

Elections in the 1760s

 Death of Pye 2 March 1766

Elections in the 1770s
 Death of Craven 14 December 1772

 Death of Griffith 12 January 1776

Elections in the 1780s

Elections in the 1790s

 Death of Hartley 12 August 1794

 Note (1796): Party labels; poll 5 days (Source: Stooks Smith)

Elections in the 1800s

Elections in the 1810s

 Note (1812): Poll 15 days; 1,992 voted. (Source: Stooks Smith). Stooks Smith and Thorn refer to the Hon. Richard Griffin as the Hon. R. Neville, a name he used before 1797 - see Baron Braybrooke for more details.

 Note (1818): Poll 15 days. (Source: Stooks Smith). Stooks Smith and Thorn refer to the Hon. Richard Griffin as the Hon. R. Neville, see note (1812).

Elections in the 1820s

 Note (1820): Poll 15 days; 1,258 voted. Stooks Smith refers to the Hon. Richard Griffin as the Hon. R. Neville, see note (1812). Stooks Smith commented that "this was the third election at which Mr Hallett, without any chance of success, kept the poll open for 15 days".

Elections in the 1830s

 Creation of Dundas as Baron Amesbury

 Poll 7 days

Elections in the 1840s

Elections in the 1850s

Elections in the 1860s
 Death of Vernon

Elections in the 1870s

 Resignation of Benyon

Elections in the 1880s

 

 Constituency divided in the 1885 redistribution

See also
List of former United Kingdom Parliament constituencies
Unreformed House of Commons

References
Citations

Sources

 British Parliamentary Election Results 1832-1885, compiled and edited by F.W.S. Craig (The Macmillan Press 1977)Cobbett's Parliamentary history of England, from the Norman Conquest in 1066 to the year 1803 (London: Thomas Hansard, 1808) 
 The House of Commons 1509-1558, by S.T. Bindoff (Secker & Warburg 1982)
 The House of Commons 1558-1603, by P.W. Hasler (HMSO 1981)
 The House of Commons 1660-1690, by Basil Duke Henning (Secker & Warburg 1983)
 The House of Commons 1690-1715, by Eveline Cruickshanks, Stuart Handley and D.W. Hayton (Cambridge University Press 2002)
 The House of Commons 1715-1754, by Romney Sedgwick (HMSO 1970)
 The House of Commons 1754-1790, by Sir Lewis Namier and John Brooke (HMSO 1964)
 The House of Commons 1790-1820, by R.G. Thorne (Secker & Warburg 1986)
 The Parliaments of England by Henry Stooks Smith (1st edition published in three volumes 1844-50), second edition edited (in one volume) by F.W.S. Craig (Political Reference Publications 1973)
 Who's Who of British Members of Parliament: Volume I 1832-1885, edited by M. Stenton (The Harvester Press 1976)
John Cannon, Parliamentary Representation 1832 - England and Wales (Cambridge: Cambridge University Press, 1973)
 J Holladay Philbin, Parliamentary Reform 1640-1832 (New Haven: Yale University Press, 1965)
 Edward Porritt and Annie G Porritt, The Unreformed House of Commons'' (Cambridge University Press, 1903)

Constituencies of the Parliament of the United Kingdom established in 1265
Constituencies of the Parliament of the United Kingdom disestablished in 1885
Parliamentary constituencies in Berkshire (historic)